This article gives an overview of liberalism in Luxembourg. Organized liberalism has since 1904 been one of the three major political forces in the Grand-Duchy. It is limited to liberal parties with substantial support, mainly proved by having had a representation in parliament. The sign ⇒ denotes another party in that scheme. Not all parties listed have the word "liberal" in their names.

History
Each of the following sections describes an element of Luxembourg's liberalism, beginning with the 20th century. The Democratic Party (Demokratesch Partei/Parti Démocratique, member LI, ALDE) is the traditional liberal party.

From Liberal League to Radical Liberal Party
1904: The Luxembourgian liberals organised themselves in the Liberal League (Ligue Libérale)
1925: The Liberal League fell apart in the Radical Socialist Party (Parti Radical-Socialiste), the ⇒ Radical Party (1928) and the ⇒ Liberal Left
1931: The Radical-Socialist-affiliated Progressive Democratic Party of the North (Parti Démocratique Progressiste du Nord) was established.
1934: The liberal parties re-united into the Radical Liberal Party (Parti Radical-Libérale)
1937: The PDPN  is renamed into the Liberal Party (Parti Libéral).
1940: The party is banned by Germany
1945: A new Liberal Party (Parti Libéral) was founded.
1950: The Liberal Party merged into the ⇒ Patriotic and Democratic Group.
1974: A new Liberal Party (Parti Libéral) seceded from the  ⇒ Democratic Party.
1980: The Liberal Party disbanded.

Liberal Left
1925: The Liberal Left (Gauche Libérale) seceded from the  ⇒ Liberal League
1934: The liberal parties re-united into the  ⇒ Radical Liberal Party

Radical Party
1925: The Radical Party (Parti Radical) seceded from the  ⇒ Liberal League
1934: The liberal parties re-united into the  ⇒ Radical Liberal Party

From Patriotic and Democratic Group to Democratic Party
1944: After the liberation liberals and members of resistance groups established the Patriotic and Democratic Group (Groupement Patriotique et Démocratique)
1952: The party is renamed into the Democratic Group (Groupement Démocratique)
1954: The party is renamed into the Democratic Party (Parti Démocratique or Demokratesch Partei)

Prominent liberals
 Xavier Bettel
 Robert Brasseur
 Paul Eyschen
 Colette Flesch
 Lydie Polfer
 Gaston Thorn

See also
History of Luxembourg
Politics of Luxembourg
List of political parties in Luxembourg